Siberia is a 1926 American silent drama film directed by Victor Schertzinger and starring Alma Rubens, Edmund Lowe, and Tom Santschi. It was produced and distributed by Fox Film Corporation. Made on a relatively high budget of around $250,000, it was considered a disappointment and barely made back its costs.

Plot 

The Imperial Russian Army officer Leonid Petroff and the pro-revolutionary schoolteacher Sonia Vronsky fall in love. She is exiled to Siberia with her brother Kyrill, but Petroff is posted there and they continue their romance. After the October Revolution Vronsky and Petroff escape the country while being pursued by the Bolshevik leader Egor Kaplan.

Cast

Preservation
With no prints of Siberia in any film archives, it is a lost film.

See also
1937 Fox vault fire

Bibliography
 Solomon, Aubrey. The Fox Film Corporation, 1915-1935: A History and Filmography. McFarland, 2011.

References

External links

lantern slide

1926 films
American silent feature films
Lost American films
American black-and-white films
Films directed by Victor Schertzinger
Fox Film films
1920s English-language films
Films set in Russia
1926 drama films
Silent American drama films
1926 lost films
Lost drama films
Russian Revolution films
1920s American films